André Filipe Claro de Jesus (born 31 March 1991), known as Claro, is a Portuguese professional footballer who plays for Valadares Gaia FC as a forward.

Club career
Born in Vila Nova de Gaia, Porto District, Claro arrived in FC Porto's youth system in 2004, aged 13. He went on to progress through every youth rank at the club, being occasionally summoned to the first team for training.

Released by the Dragons in the summer of 2010, Claro signed for F.C. Famalicão in the fourth division, scoring 14 goals in 32 matches in his first season which ended in promotion to the third tier. He added ten in 30 the following campaign.

Claro joined F.C. Arouca of the Segunda Liga for 2012–13, scoring in only his second game in the competition, a 3–0 away win against F.C. Penafiel on 22 August 2012. He contributed 31 appearances and four goals, as the team promoted to the Primeira Liga for the first time in their history. He made his debut in the competition on 18 August 2013 by coming on as a late substitute in a 5–1 away loss to Sporting CP, and scored his first goals on 22 December of that year in a 3–0 away defeat of Gil Vicente F.C. where he netted a brace.

On 13 July 2015, after his contract expired, Claro signed a two-year deal with Vitória F.C. also in the top flight.

References

External links

1991 births
Living people
Sportspeople from Vila Nova de Gaia
Portuguese footballers
Association football forwards
Primeira Liga players
Liga Portugal 2 players
Segunda Divisão players
FC Porto players
Padroense F.C. players
F.C. Famalicão players
F.C. Arouca players
Vitória F.C. players
G.D. Estoril Praia players
Boavista F.C. players
Associação Académica de Coimbra – O.A.F. players
Leixões S.C. players
U.D. Vilafranquense players
Académico de Viseu F.C. players
Portugal youth international footballers